Laurie Osher (born June 8, 1960) is an American politician, who was elected to the Maine House of Representatives in 2020. She will represent the 123rd House District as a member of the Maine Democratic Party.

Prior to her election to the state legislature, Osher served on the town council of Orono.

References

1960 births
Lesbian politicians
LGBT state legislators in Maine
Democratic Party members of the Maine House of Representatives
Living people
21st-century American politicians
21st-century American women politicians
American LGBT city council members
Women city councillors in Maine